Pricia is a Gram-negative, aerobic, rod-shaped and non-motile genus of bacteria from the family of Flavobacteriaceae with one known species (Pricia antarctica).

References

Flavobacteria
Bacteria genera
Monotypic bacteria genera
Taxa described in 2012